The Encyclopedia of Science Fiction (SFE) is an English language reference work on science fiction, first published in 1979. It has won the Hugo, Locus and British SF Awards. Two print editions appeared in 1979 and 1993. A third, continuously revised, edition was published online from 2011; a change of web host was announced as the launch of a fourth edition in 2021.

History 

The first edition, edited by Peter Nicholls with John Clute, was published by Granada in 1979. It was retitled The Science Fiction Encyclopedia when published by Doubleday in the United States. Accompanying its text were numerous black and white photographs illustrating authors, book and magazine covers, film and TV stills, and examples of artists' work.

A second edition, jointly edited by Nicholls and Clute, was published in 1993 by Orbit in the UK and St. Martin's Press in the US. The second edition contained 1.3 million words, almost twice the 700,000 words of the 1979 edition. The 1995 paperback edition included a sixteen-page addendum (dated "7 August 1995"). Unlike the first edition, the print versions did not contain illustrations. There was also a CD-ROM version in 1995, styled variously as The Multimedia Encyclopedia of Science Fiction and Grolier Science Fiction. This contained text updates through 1995, hundreds of book covers and author photos, a small number of old film trailers, and author video clips taken from the TVOntario series Prisoners of Gravity.

The companion volume, published after the second print edition and following its format closely, is The Encyclopedia of Fantasy edited by John Clute and John Grant.
All print and CD-ROM editions are currently out of print.

In July 2011, Orion Publishing Group announced that the third edition of The Science Fiction Encyclopedia would be released online later that year by SFE Ltd in association with Victor Gollancz, Orion's science fiction imprint. The "beta text" of the third edition launched online on 2 October 2011, with editors John Clute, David Langford, Peter Nicholls (as editor emeritus until his death in 2018) and Graham Sleight. The encyclopedia is updated regularly (usually several times a week) by the editorial team with material written by themselves and contributed by science fiction academics and experts. It received the Hugo Award for Best Related Work in 2012. Though the SFE is a composite work with a considerable number of contributors, the three main editors (Clute, Langford and Nicholls) have themselves written almost two-thirds of the 5.2 million words to date (September 2016), giving a sense of unity to the whole.

The Encyclopedia ended its arrangement with Orion on 29 September 2021 and moved to a new, self-owned web server. The move was completed by 6 October 2021, and announced as the launch of the fourth edition. While based on the earlier design, the new edition incorporates a number of revisions; for instance, many author entries now include thumbnails of the author's book covers, randomly selected from the relevant Gallery pages.

Contents 
The Encyclopedia of Science Fiction contains entries under the categories of authors, themes, terminology, science fiction in various countries, films, filmmakers, television, magazines, fanzines, comics, illustrators, book publishers, original anthologies, awards, and miscellaneous.

The online edition of The Encyclopedia of Science Fiction was released in October 2011 with 12,230 entries, totaling 3,200,000 words. The editors predicted that it would contain 4,000,000 words upon completion of the first round of updates at the end of 2012; this figure was actually reached in January 2013, and 5,000,000 words in November 2015.

Awards

Publications 
 First edition:
  672 pp.
 Second edition:
  xxxvi + 1370 pp. 
  xxxvi + 1386 pp. 
   
  xxxvi + 1396 pp. 
 Third edition:
  
 Fourth edition:

See also

 The Encyclopedia of Fantasy
 Encyclopedia of Science Fiction (1978 book)
 The Greenwood Encyclopedia of Science Fiction and Fantasy
 The Visual Encyclopedia of Science Fiction

References

External links
 SFE: The Encyclopedia of Science Fiction, 2014—current online edition 
 Self-referential entry on the Encyclopedia, written by David Langford
 SF Encyclopedia Editorial Home (sf-encyclopedia.co.uk)—with data on multiple editions
 "Formats and Editions of The Encyclopedia of Science Fiction at WorldCat
 1993 SF Encyclopedia Updates—"New Data, Typographical Errors, Factual Corrections, and Miscellanea; Last updated September 2002"—superseded by the 2011 edition
 
 "Q&A with the Founder of The Encyclopedia of Science Fiction, The Independent, 12 January 2012—Neela Debnath with Peter Nicholls

Encyclopedias of literature
British encyclopedias
Online encyclopedias
20th-century encyclopedias
Science fiction books
Science fiction studies
Hugo Award for Best Non-Fiction Book winning works
Hugo Award for Best Related Work-winning works
1979 non-fiction books
1993 non-fiction books
British online encyclopedias